Louis Jolyon West (October 6, 1924 – January 2, 1999) was an American psychiatrist involved in the public sphere. In 1954, at the age of 29 and with no previous tenure-track appointment, he became a full professor and chair of psychiatry at the University of Oklahoma College of Medicine. From 1969 to 1989, he served as chair of psychiatry at the University of California, Los Angeles School of Medicine and the UCLA Neuropsychiatric Institute.

West's work on brainwashing techniques allowed him to exonerate U.S. servicemen under suspicion of treason for making false confessions during the Korean War-era. This brought him to the attention of the CIA. He pioneered research into the use and abuse of LSD.

West was also active in studying the creation and management of cults and anti-death penalty activism. Along with friend Charlton Heston, he supported the Civil Rights Movement, frequently participating in sit-ins and rallies.

Early life
West was born in Brooklyn, New York to a Ukrainian Jewish immigrant father and a mother who taught piano. He grew up in poverty in Madison, Wisconsin. He subsequently attended the University of Wisconsin–Madison for a year and, after completing prerequisite coursework at the University of Iowa under the aegis of the Army Specialized Training Program during World War II, earned his M.D. from the University of Minnesota Medical School in 1949. Thereafter, he completed his residency at the Payne Whitney Psychiatric Clinic of Cornell University on the Upper East Side of Manhattan in 1952.

Korean War POWs and brainwashing
West was an officer in the United States Air Force Medical Service from 1948 to 1956, attaining the rank of major. While assigned to Lackland Air Force Base after his residency, he was appointed to a panel to discover why 36 of 59 airmen captured in the Korean War had confessed or cooperated in North Korean allegations of war crimes committed by the United States. Amid speculation that the airmen had been brainwashed or drugged, West came to a simpler conclusion: "What we found enabled us to rule out drugs, hypnosis or other mysterious trickery," he said. He observed that "[i]t was just one device used to confuse, bewilder and torment our men until they were ready to confess to anything. That device was prolonged, chronic loss of sleep." The airmen avoided being court-martialed for these events as a result of West's research.

He then published a paper with the title "United States Airforce prisoners of the Chinese Communist. Methods of forceful indoctrination: Observations and Interviews."

Project MKUltra

Cornell University, where West completed his residency in psychiatry, was an MKUltra institution and the site of the Human Ecology Fund. He later became a subcontractor for MKUltra subproject 43, a 20,800 USD grant by the CIA while he was chairman of the department of Psychiatry at the University of Oklahoma. The proposal submitted by West was titled "Psychophysiological Studies of Hypnosis and Suggestibility" with an accompanying document titled "Studies of Dissociative States".

LSD-related death of an elephant
One of the more unusual incidents in West's career took place in August 1962. He and two co-workers attempted to investigate the phenomenon of musth in elephants by dosing Tusko, a bull elephant at the Lincoln Park Zoo in Oklahoma City, with LSD. They expected that the drug would trigger a state similar to musth; instead, the animal began to have seizures 5 minutes after LSD was administered. Beginning twenty minutes later, West and his colleagues administered the antipsychotic promazine hydrochloride; they injected a total of 2800 mg over 11 minutes. This large promazine dose was not effective and may have contributed to the animal's death. It died an hour and 40 minutes after the LSD was given. Later, many theories developed about why Tusko had died. Some researchers thought that West and his colleagues had made the mistake of scaling up the dose in proportion to the animal's body weight, rather than its brain weight, and without considering other factors, such as its metabolic rate. Another theory was that while the LSD had caused Tusko distress, the drugs administered in an attempt to revive him caused death. Attempting to prove that the LSD alone had not been the cause of death, Ronald K. Siegel of UCLA repeated a variant of West's experiment on two elephants; he administered to two elephants equivalent doses (in milligrams per kilogram) to that which had been given to Tusko, mixing the LSD in their drinking water rather than directly injecting it. Neither elephant expired or exhibited any great distress, although both behaved strangely for a number of hours.

Jack Ruby

Following the murder of Lee Harvey Oswald in Dallas, Texas in 1963, his assassin Jack Ruby was held in an isolation cell in police custody. West was appointed as Ruby's psychiatrist, and pronounced him psychotic and delusional, and suggested further interrogation under the influence of sodium pentathol and hypnosis.

Patty Hearst trial
During Patty Hearst's 1976 trial, West was appointed by the court in his capacity as a brainwashing expert and worked without fee. Believing that Hearst displayed all the classic signs of coercion, brainwashing, and the Stockholm effect, West wrote a newspaper article after the trial, asking President Carter to release Hearst from prison. Some weeks after her arrest, Hearst repudiated her SLA allegiance.

Conflict with Scientologists
According to West, Scientologists attempted to discredit him and get him fired, using methods similar to those used in Operation Freakout. This was allegedly done after his contributions to a 1980 textbook that classified Scientology as a cult.

West participated in an American Psychiatric Association panel on cults. Each speaker had received a letter threatening a lawsuit if Scientology were mentioned; apparently others were intimidated. Only West, the last speaker, referred to the letter and the cult: 
"I read parts of the letter to the 1,000-plus psychiatrists and then told any Scientologists in the crowd to pay attention. I said I would like to advise my colleagues that I consider Scientology a cult and L. Ron Hubbard a quack and a fake. I wasn't about to let them intimidate me."

Personal life
In 1999, West died at his home in Los Angeles at age 74. His family said the cause of death was metastatic cancer. However, West's son John would later assert in a 2009 memoir that he helped his father end his life at the latter's choice by using prescription medication due to the terminal illness.

Works
 "Pseudo-Identity and the Treatment of Personality Change in Victims of Captivity and Cults." In: Dissociation: Clinical and Theoretical Perspectives, with Steven Jay Lynn and Judith W. Rhue, eds. New York: Guilford Press (Aug. 1994). .
 Drug Testing: Issues and Options, with Robert H. Coombs, eds. New York: Oxford University Press (Apr. 1991). .
 Alcoholism and Related Problems: Issues for the American Public. American Assembly Series. Englewood Cliffs, NJ: Prentice-Hall (Oct. 1984). .
 "Cults, Quacks and Non-professional Psychotherapies" (with M.T. Singer). In: Comprehensive Textbook of Psychiatry, with H. Kaplan and B. Sadock. 3rd ed. Baltimore: Williams and Wilkins (1980), pp. 3245–58.
 Hallucinations: Behavior, Experience, and Theory, with Ronald K. Siegel, eds. New York: John Wiley & Sons (Oct. 1975). .

 "Brainwashing, Conditioning and DDD (Debility, Dependency, and Dread)," with I. E. Farber and Harry F. Harlow. Sociometry, vol. 20, no. 4 (1957), pp. 271-285. .

References

1924 births
1999 deaths
20th-century American physicians
United States Air Force personnel of the Korean War
American psychiatrists
Critics of Scientology
Lysergic acid diethylamide
Mind control theorists
People of the Central Intelligence Agency
Project MKUltra
Psychedelic drug researchers
United States Air Force Medical Corps officers
University of Minnesota Medical School alumni
University of Oklahoma alumni
University of Wisconsin–Madison alumni
Deaths from cancer in California
American people of Ukrainian-Jewish descent
Human subject research in the United States